The Tri-Eastern Conference is a nine-member IHSAA-Sanctioned Athletic Conference formed by five schools in 1962. The current nine teams are located in the counties of Henry, Randolph, Union, and Wayne.

History
The conference was formed in 1962, with Cambridge City, Centerville, Knightstown, Liberty, and Union City. All five are current members of the conference, albeit two have different names through consolidation (Cambridge City became Lincoln in 1965, and Liberty became Short in 1965, then Union County in 1973). Brookville (now Franklin County) and Hagerstown joined in 1966 to bring the membership to 7, however Knightstown would leave in 1968 (with Brookville following suit in 1973). The conference would grow to 7 members in the 1970s, adding Winchester (1972) and Northeastern (1974). Tri joined in 1989 to bring the conference to eight. Knightstown would rejoin in 2017 with a phased program, with some sports joining in 2018.

Membership

 Knightstown played 1968-89 in the Big Blue River, 1989-95, 2010-13 and 2016-17 as independents, 1995 to 2010 in the White River Conference, and 2013-16 in the Mid-Hoosier Conference.

Former Members

 Known as Liberty before 1965.

Membership timeline

Conference Champions

References

Resources 
 IHSAA Conferences
 IHSAA Directory

Indiana high school athletic conferences
High school sports conferences and leagues in the United States